Parting phrases, which are valedictions used to acknowledge the parting of individuals or groups of people from each other, are elements of parting traditions. Parting phrases are specific to culture and situation, and vary based on the social status and relationship of the persons involved.

Parting phrases commonly used by speakers of English

In English, there are formal and informal ways of saying goodbye. Additionally, in day-to-day speech, English-speaking people sometimes use foreign parting phrases, such as the French terms au revoir or bon voyage, German terms auf Wiedersehen or tschüss, Hawaiian term aloha, Italian terms arrivederci or ciao, Japanese term sayōnara, or Spanish terms adiós, hasta luego, hasta mañana, or hasta la vista.

Religious and traditional parting phrases 
 "As-Salamu Alaykum" or "Salam" ("Peace be upon you"), used among Muslims and Arabs
 "Blessed Be", used among many Pagans as a greeting or a parting phrase
 "Goodbye", an English parting phrase used in the West, is a contraction of "God be by ye".
 "Don't be a stranger" is a parting phrase in English.
 "In Christ", used by some Christians, especially clerics
 "Khuda Hafiz" ("God protect (you)"), used among Iranians and South Asian Muslims
 "Merry meet, merry part, and merry meet again", another common parting phrase among Wicca practitioners
 "Namaste", used by some followers of different Indian religions and New Age practitioners
 "Shalom" ("Peace"), used among Jews and by some Christians
 "Waheguru Ji ka Khalsa, Waheguru Ji ki Fateh" ("Khalsa belongs to Waheguru; Victory is gifted by Waheguru"), used among Sikhs

Phrases from fictional works
Some commonly used parting phrases are popularized by fictional works, such as:
"Hasta la vista, baby", a parting phrase popularized by The Terminator entertainment franchise
"I'll be back", another one from that franchise
while others were created for fictional worlds and adopted by the real world, such as:
"Live long and prosper", a Vulcan salute from the Star Trek entertainment franchise
"May the Force be with you", a parting phrase from the Star Wars entertainment franchise

Written parting phrases

Various cultures historically have elaborate epistolary traditions, in particular how to end a letter, which is seen as a parting with the invisible partner in dialogue. 

English language letters are ended with the sender's name (for example, John Doe). Thus, epistolary parting phrases have the following form:
 Best regards, John Doe
 Best wishes, John Doe
 Respectfully yours, John Doe
 Yours sincerely, John Doe (if the recipient is known to the sender)
 Yours faithfully, John Doe (if the recipient is unknown to the sender)
 Yours truly, John Doe

See also
 Greeting
 Salutation
 Valediction
 The Parting Glass

References

Further reading